Mason wasp is a common name that can refer to several different types of wasps:

Potter wasp, of the subfamily Eumeninae in the family Vespidae
Pison spinolae, in the family Sphecidae

Animal common name disambiguation pages